Anika Larsen (born December 19, 1973) is an American actress and singer. She was nominated for the Tony Award for Best Featured Actress in a Musical in 2014 for portraying Cynthia Weil in Beautiful: The Carole King Musical. Larsen has made an album of recordings titled, Sing You To Sleep.

Personal life
Larsen was raised in Cambridge, Massachusetts in a blended family of adopted children, from Cambodia, Vietnam, and America. She studied theatre at Yale University and performed in the a cappella choir, Shades.

In 2015 she married musician Freddie Maxwell and gave birth to their first child, a son named Kie Larsen Maxwell. In 2017, she gave birth to their second son, Ashe.

Career
Larsen made her Broadway debut in 2000 in the ensemble of Rent. In 2002 she originated the role of Roberta in the cult Off-Broadway musical, Zanna, Don't!, for which she received a Lucille Lortel Award nomination for Best Featured Actress in a Musical.

In 2005 she again appeared on Broadway in the ensemble of All Shook Up and in 2007 performed in the original Broadway ensemble of Xanadu. She has also performed in Avenue Q playing the role of Lucy the Slut/Kate Monster on National Tour, Broadway, and Off-Broadway.

In 2019, The Old Globe Theatre premiered the musical Almost Famous, based on the Cameron Crowe film of the same name, with additional music and lyrics by Tom Kitt, with Larsen starring as Elaine Miller (played by Frances McDormand in the film.

Larsen is the founder of the Jaradoa Theatre Company, which combines performance with community service. In 2009 a musical based on her own life, titled Shafrika: The White Girl, dealing with her experiences of living with a blended adoptive family, was staged at the Vineyard Theatre.

References

External links
 Official website
 
 
 

1973 births
American stage actresses
Living people
Singers from Massachusetts
21st-century American singers
21st-century American actresses